Ramudochadu is a 1996 Indian Telugu-language drama film, produced by Yarlagadda Surendra under the S. S. Creations banner and directed by A. Kodandarami Reddy. It stars Nagarjuna, Krishna, Soundarya and Ravali, with music composed by Raj.

Plot
The rivalry between two families splits a village "Seetaramapuram" into Seetapuram and Ramapuram. Seetapuram's head is Bhusayya and Ramapuram's head is Bhadrayya. Bhusayya is in the trap of his son-in-law Gavaraju, who always insists on taking revenge against Bhadrayya's family. Bhadrayya wants his granddaughter Sundaralakshmi to study in college, but her father Chandrayah fixes her marriage with their Village President Nagaraju, but with his father's pressure, Chandrayah sends Sundaralakshmi to college.

Ram is a college student from America who one day meets Sundaralakshmi in college, and as she isn't used to city life, Ram teaches her how to live that way. Afterwards, he goes with Sundaralakshmi to Seetapuram to spend his holidays and meets her family. But Chandrayah doesn't appreciate Ram's foreign behavior. Ram beats up one of the goons from Ramapuram as they start another fight. But Ram stops them luckily and admits that he's the one who beat the guy up, so they stopped the fight. Ram meets a village girl named Seshagiri and she falls in love with him, with the help of her, Ram tries to seduce Sundaralakshmi. Chandrayah makes Sundaralakshmi's engagement arrangements with Nagaraju, where she admits her love with Ram. But Chandrayah doesn't agree, he keeps a challenge to Ram that he should cultivate the agriculture land of 100 acres. Ram accepts the challenge and wins it.

Meanwhile, Ram discovers that Nagaraju secretly works for Gavaraju, they plan their next attack at their rival village. Ram then comes in and starts a fight against both villages in which Bhusayya's wife Annapurnamma is injured, Ram saves her and tells her that he is her grandson, Gavaraju listens to that and kills Annapurnamma and proclaims that if any heir is there in the village to give a funeral to her, then Ram should admit the secret.

Krishna Prasad, son of Bhusayya is treated as god by the entire village, because he doesn't have any disparity of rich and poor. He is loving and marries Bhadrayya's daughter Arundathi without their permission, for that reason his father sends him out. After some time, Arundhati gets pregnant, Krishna Prasad is willing to send his wife to America for higher education. Gavaraju plans to kill Krishna Prasad and Arundathi and in the attack, Krishna Prasad dies saving Arundathi, but people think both of them die, which splits the village into two and the temple between the village is closed.

Ram is the son of Krishna Prasad and Arundathi, that's why he played this entire game to join both villages as his mother's last wish. Meanwhile, Bhusayya also owns up to the truth and he changes. Finally, Ram sees the end of Gavaraju, joins both villages into "Seetaramapuram" and the temple is re-opened with Ram and Sundaralakshmi's marriage.

Cast

 Nagarjuna as Ram
 Soundarya as Sundarlakshmi
 Ravali as Seshagiri
 Krishna as Krishna Prasad (Cameo Appearance)
 Suhasini as Arundathi (Cameo Appearance)
 Satyanarayana as Bhadrayya
 Srihari as Nagaraju
 Nambiar as Bhusayya
 Anand Raj as Gavaraju
 Chandramohan as Chandrayah
 Chalapathi Rao as Servant
 Jayanthi as Annapurnamma
 Sudha as Venkai
 Y. Vijaya as Bhadrayya's wife
 Prasad Babu as Madhavayya
 Ali as Basha
 AVS as Principal
 Babu Mohan as Bengal
 Mallikarjuna Rao as Chandamama
 Krishnaveni as Warden
  Poojitha  as Nagma
 Kashmera Shah as special appearance in an item song
 Master Harsha as Ankappa

Soundtrack

The music was composed by Raj. Music released on SUPREME Music Company.

References

External links
 

1996 films
Films directed by A. Kodandarami Reddy
1990s Telugu-language films